Indirect presidential elections were held in Nauru on 1 November 2010 following the parliamentary elections held on 28 April 2010 and the repeated elections on 19 June 2010. The election was attempted to be held on 3 June 2010 and then on 4 June 2010, but failed both times. Another attempt was set for 6 July 2010 after incumbent president Marcus Stephen agreed to step aside to facilitate Aloysius Amwano's election as speaker. Rykers Solomon, an opposition MP, joined the government on 6 July 2010, but Amwano nonetheless refused to allow a motion to elect the president, suspending parliament until 8 July 2010. Amwano was subsequently dismissed by president Stephen and replaced by deputy speaker Landon Deireragea.

By 30 July 2010, parliament still had not sat since the sacking of Amwano, and president Stephen extended the state of emergency by another 21 days. The emergency has been extended several times since, and will now continue into October.

The deadlock was finally broken when former president Ludwig Scotty accepted the nomination to become speaker, and Stephen was elected over opposition MP Milton Dube in a secret vote with 11 to 6 votes on 1 November 2010.

<- 2007
2013 ->

References

2010
2010 elections in Oceania
Presidential election